Christina Marie Riggs (September 2, 1971 – May 2, 2000) was convicted of the November 1997 murders of her two children, Justin Dalton Thomas (age 5) and Shelby Alexis Riggs (age 2). Riggs was a licensed practical nurse, and she planned to kill the children with injections of drugs she obtained from her hospital. When she injected her son with potassium chloride, it caused pain but not death, so she smothered both children to death then attempted suicide. 

Defense attorneys mentioned Riggs's depression and post-traumatic stress disorder during her trial, but Riggs did not put up a defense in the penalty phase. She waived her appeals and was executed by lethal injection less than two years after her convictions. She was the first woman to be executed in Arkansas since 1845.

Early life
Riggs was born Christina Marie Thomas in Lawton, Oklahoma, and she grew up in Oklahoma City. She said she was sexually abused as a child, and she began using alcohol, tobacco and marijuana by the age of 14. She became pregnant for the first time at age 16; she gave the child up for adoption. After finishing high school, Riggs became a licensed practical nurse and worked in home health nursing and for a Veterans Administration hospital.

Riggs became pregnant with her son Justin in 1991. The child's father was not involved in their lives, but before Justin was born in June 1992, she began dating Jon Riggs. Christina and Jon Riggs married in 1993, and they had a daughter, Shelby, in December 1994. The couple moved to Sherwood, Arkansas, where her mother lived, in 1995, and Christina Riggs got a job there at Baptist Hospital. Christina and Jon Riggs divorced after she said he struck Justin in the stomach.

Murders
Riggs's children were killed in their beds at the family's home in Sherwood. Riggs had planned to give the children a combination of injectable potassium chloride, amitriptyline sedative pills, and the injectable pain medication morphine. She obtained the amitriptyline from a local pharmacy, and she stole the morphine and potassium chloride from the hospital where she worked.

Riggs injected the potassium chloride into Justin first, and the undiluted medication caused a great deal of burning in his veins but did not kill him. She tried to inject him with morphine to ease his pain, but it did not help, so she smothered him to death. She smothered her daughter Shelby, without injecting her, after seeing the pain that the potassium caused Justin. She laid the children on her bed, covered them with a blanket, and wrote suicide notes. She then attempted suicide by taking 28 amitriptyline pills and injecting herself with undiluted potassium chloride. Nineteen hours later, Riggs's mother discovered her unconscious on the floor of her home.

Trial and conviction
At her June 1998 trial, Riggs contended she was not guilty by reason of insanity, due to depression as well as the trauma that came from working as a nurse near the site of the Oklahoma City bombing. Prosecutors said Riggs committed the murders out of hatred for her children. The Pulaski County jury convicted her. During the sentencing phase, Riggs prevented her attorneys from putting on a defense, saying she wanted to be executed. She later convinced the court to allow her to drop her appeals.

Riggs was held at the McPherson Unit, which included the female death row, until her execution. The Arkansas execution chamber is located at the Cummins Unit.

Execution
On Sunday, April 30, 2000, Riggs was flown from McPherson to Cummins in preparation for her execution. She was executed at 9:28 pm Central Daylight Time on May 2, 2000. Riggs was the fifth woman executed in the United States since the reinstatement of the death penalty in 1976. She was the first woman executed in Arkansas since 1845. Her statement before execution began: "No words can express just how sorry I am for taking the lives of my babies. No way I can make up for or take away the pain I have caused everyone who knew and loved them." Her last words were, "I love you, my babies." Riggs was executed with a potassium chloride injection.

See also

 Capital punishment in Arkansas
 Capital punishment in the United States
 List of people executed in Arkansas
 List of people executed in the United States in 2000
 List of women executed in the United States since 1976

References

External links
 Deadly Women - Investigation Discovery | Twisted Minds; Marie Riggs

1971 births
1997 murders in the United States
2000 deaths
20th-century American criminals
20th-century executions by Arkansas
20th-century executions of American people
American female murderers
American murderers of children
American people executed for murder
Criminals from Oklahoma
Executed American women
Filicides in the United States
People convicted of murder by Arkansas
People executed by Arkansas by lethal injection
People from Lawton, Oklahoma
People from Sherwood, Arkansas
Poisoners